Doreen Viola Hansen Wilber (January 8, 1930 – October 19, 2008) was an American archer from Rutland, Iowa.

Biography
At the 1972 Summer Olympics in Munich, Wilber won the gold medal in the women's section of the first modern Olympic archery competition, aged 42. Along with John Williams, Wilber led the U.S. to a sweep of archery gold medals in 1972.

In the first of two FITA rounds (in which an archer shoots 36 arrows at each of 4 distances), Wilber shot for 1198 points out of a possible 1440.  This put her in fourth place at the end of the first half of competition.  Her second round score of 1226 was the best score of any archer in either round and was enough to put her well above the competition as well as set a new world record.

In the 1969 Outdoor World Championships, Wilber placed 2nd.  She was also a member of the 4th place U.S. team. She placed 2nd in the 1971 Outdoor World Championships and was a member of the 3rd place United States team.

She died of Alzheimer's disease in Jefferson, Iowa on October 19, 2008.  A bronze statue was erected in Jefferson in 2011 in memory of Wilber.

References

1930 births
2008 deaths
American female archers
Archers at the 1972 Summer Olympics
Neurological disease deaths in Iowa
Deaths from Alzheimer's disease
Olympic gold medalists for the United States in archery
People from Jefferson, Iowa
Medalists at the 1972 Summer Olympics
20th-century American women
20th-century American people
21st-century American women